On January 18, 2022, Microsoft announced its intent to acquire Activision Blizzard for $68.7 billion in cash. Under the terms of the agreement, which would be expected to close by Spring 2023 pending regulatory and shareholder approval, Microsoft would own Activision, Blizzard Entertainment, and King under the Xbox Game Studios brand. 

The acquisition would give Microsoft ownership of franchises including Call of Duty, Crash Bandicoot, Spyro, Warcraft, StarCraft, Diablo, Overwatch, and Candy Crush. If approved by international regulators, it would be the largest video game acquisition in history. Both the U.S. Federal Trade Commission (FTC) and the European Commission (EC) formally filed complaints to block the acquisition on the basis that the merger would hinder competition.

Background
Activision Blizzard is one of the largest video game publishers in the world, with annual revenues of about $8.8 billion in 2021. The company is composed of five business units: Activision Publishing, Blizzard Entertainment, King, Major League Gaming, and Activision Blizzard Studios. Among its assets are ownership of Call of Duty, Crash Bandicoot, and Spyro from Activision's studios; Warcraft, Diablo, StarCraft, and Overwatch from Blizzard Entertainment; and Candy Crush Saga from King.

Microsoft is a dominant player in computing software, and also makes the Xbox line of game consoles and operates Xbox Game Studios, a collection of developers to create first party titles. In March 2021, Microsoft closed on its acquisition of ZeniMax Media and Bethesda Softworks for an estimated , making it one of the largest video game acquisitions by that time.

History

Announcement
On January 18, 2022, Microsoft announced its intent to acquire Activision Blizzard for $68.7 billion in an all-cash deal, or approximately $95 per share. Activision Blizzard's stock price jumped nearly 40% that day in pre-market trading. The deal would make Microsoft the third-largest gaming company in the world and the largest headquartered in the Americas, behind Chinese company Tencent and the Japanese conglomerate Sony. If closed, it would also be the most expensive video game-related acquisition in to date. Goldman Sachs will serve as the financial advisor to Microsoft, and Allen & Company will be Activision's financial advisors. Simpson Thacher will serve as legal advisor for Microsoft while Skadden will serve as legal advisor for Activision. The deal has been approved by both companies' board of directors and is expected to close in 2023 following international government regulatory review of the action. Upon completion of the deal, Activision Blizzard would be a sibling entity to Xbox Game Studios under a new Microsoft Gaming division with Phil Spencer as its lead. The deal would also allow Microsoft to offer Activision Blizzard games on its Xbox Game Pass service. Spencer also spoke about reviving some older Activision Blizzard franchises he himself enjoyed, mentioning series such as King's Quest, Guitar Hero and Hexen: Beyond Heretic.

Kotick stated that he, Spencer, and Microsoft's CEO Satya Nadella have had discussions in 2021 on their concern of the power of Tencent, NetEase, Apple, Inc. and Google, and that Activision Blizzard lacked the computation expertise in machine learning and data analytics that would be necessary to compete with these companies. According to Kotick, this led to the idea of Microsoft, which does have those capabilities, acquiring Activision Blizzard at an attractive price point. In a statement released on Activision Blizzard's investor website, the company said its industry is the "most dynamic and exciting category of entertainment across all platforms" and that gaming will be the forefront of the development of the emerging metaverse. Some journalists saw this acquisition, and Microsoft's March 2021 acquisition of Bethesda Softworks, as a bid to compete against Meta Platforms, formerly known as Facebook.

The announcement had come in the wake of events related to California Department of Fair Employment and Housing v. Activision Blizzard, A lawsuit raised in July 2021 accusing the company of sexual harassment, employment discrimination and retaliation on the part of Activision Blizzard. Allegations had expanded by November 2021 to include actions that Activision Blizzard's CEO Bobby Kotick had done. The timing of the acquisition was reported by The Wall Street Journal and Bloomberg News to be in response to the ongoing DFEH lawsuit. Reports from both newspapers stated that Activision Blizzard had been considering a buyout from other companies, including Facebook parent company Meta Platforms, due to the weaker than expected financial performance of their latest game releases and production delays. Based on SEC filings related to the merger, Microsoft approached Activision Blizzard again in the days immediately following the November 2021 Wall Street Journal report regarding a buyout. While Kotick had been hesitant about selling the company, the board had gone ahead with the deal as they continued to fear the ongoing impact of the lawsuit while Kotick had remains on the board The buyout would provide a graceful exit for Kotick in the future, ranging in $252.2-292.9 million over most scenarios.

According to official announcements, under the deal Kotick will remain the CEO of Activision Blizzard, and is expected to keep the position while the deal goes through regulatory processes, as Activision Blizzard remains independent from Microsoft until the deal closes. According to The Wall Street Journal, Kotick "will depart once the deal closes" under Microsoft's management, while Kotick said in an interview that he has an interest in remaining in the company. Microsoft has yet to speak directly about the Activision Blizzard lawsuit following news of the acquisition, however the company announced a week prior that it would be reviewing its own sexual harassment and gender discrimination policies.

Activision Blizzard's shareholders approved of the acquisition near-unanimously in April 2022.

Regulatory response 
Due to the size of the acquisition, the deal is being reviewed by several government commerce bodies for antitrust concerns. As of December 2022, Saudi Arabia, Brazil, Serbia and Chile have approved the acquisition with zero regulatory concessions for Microsoft.

U.S. Federal Trade Commission (FTC) 
In the United States, the acquisition was reviewed by the Federal Trade Commission (FTC) rather than traditionally by the U.S. Department of Justice, as the agency had raised more concerns over mergers and acquisitions in the Big Tech sector in the last decade. U.S. Senators Elizabeth Warren, Bernie Sanders, Sheldon Whitehouse, and Cory Booker expressed their concerns about the merger to the FTC as part of the FTC's investigation, saying that both companies have "failed to protect the rights and dignity of their workers" and that the merger should be opposed if "the transaction is likely to enhance monopsony power and worsen the negotiating position between workers and the parties." The FTC formally stated its intention to block the acquisition as proposed on December 8, 2022. The FTC expressed concern that the acquisition would harm consumers of Activision Blizzard's games and give Microsoft too much control of certain parts of the industry, such as cloud gaming. The FTC also pointed to the acquisition of Zenimax, which the FTC claimed that Microsoft had agreed to a concession from the European Union to not make their games exclusive to the Xbox and later broke. In a statement made to Axios' Stephan Totilo, the European Commission stated that they had cleared Microsoft's acquisition of Zenimax unconditionally as they saw no "material impact" on the gaming market even if Microsoft made Zenimax's titles exclusive.

Microsoft responded to the FTC's complaint that Sony itself is one of the largest platforms with exclusive titles that contractually cannot be made for Xbox. They also said they still plan to offer content for multiplayer Bethesda games like Elder Scrolls Online and Fallout 76 for all platforms to avoid undercutting the playerbase. Microsoft also initially challenged the constitutionality of the FTC due to the ability for the Commissioner to be removed by the President at will, and the their use of administrative law judges to initially review cases, both which have founding in recent Supreme Court cases, but removed this language in an amended response, sticking to the video game market. In February 2023, the FTC denied a request by Sony to drop a subpoena filed by Microsoft, requesting internal documentation from Sony related to their third-party exclusivity deals.

European Commission 
After receiving a formal notification by Microsoft on September 30, 2022, the European Commission began its first phase review of the acquisition under the EU merger law. The Commission sent out a questionnaire to several game industry firms to ask them about the potential impact of the acquisition on their livelihood, including if Microsoft does opt to lock rivals out of Activision games in the future. The Commission announced on November 8, 2022, that it will conduct an additional review of the merger "to ensure that the gaming ecosystem remains vibrant to the benefit of users in a sector that is evolving at a fast pace." The results of this review are expected by April 2023.

The EC filed its formal complaint against the acquisition on February 3, 2023. The EC said they were considered that Microsoft may be "incentivized to block access to Activision’s popular Call of Duty franchise", which could lead to "reduce competition in the markets for the distribution of console and PC video games, leading to higher prices, lower quality and less innovation for console game distributors, which may, in turn, be passed on to consumers." Microsoft met with the EC regulators on February 21, 2023, announcing that they had secured a ten-year agreement with Nintendo to bring Call of Duty to that platform alongside the Xbox release, as well as a separate ten-year agreement providing Call of Duty and other first-party Microsoft games with NVidia as part of their GeForce Now streaming service.

UK Competition and Markets Authority 
The UK's Competition and Markets Authority stated its intent to perform a higher-level review of the acquisition in August 2022. The phase 1 ruling, issued on September 1, 2022, said that the merger "may be expected to result in a substantial lessening of competition within a market or markets in the United Kingdom". Preliminary findings of phase 2 of the investigation was reported on February 8, 2023, concluding that the acquisition "could result in higher prices, fewer choices, and less innovation for UK gamers", as well as less competition in the console and cloud gaming spaces. The CMA has recommended that Activision should at least divest the Call of Duty franchise. The full report is expected on April 26, 2023.

Others 
The U.S. Securities and Exchange Commission (SEC) reviewed potential claims that investors close to Kotick engaged in insider trading prior to the acquisition announcement. Activision Blizzard said they would fully cooperate with the SEC's review.

The deal is also seeing review in Japan, Australia, New Zealand, and elsewhere. In December 2022, it was announced Chile's regulatory authority (Fiscalia Nacional Economica), had released its ruling on the acquisition and had voted to approve the deal in Phase 1.

Legal challenges
The New York City Employees' Retirement System, which are shareholders of Activision Blizzard, sued the company in April 2022, arguing that the company had made the acquisition deal quickly with Microsoft as to try to cover up the misdoings of Kotick that had been uncovered as part of the ongoing DCEH lawsuit and escape any liability.

Sjunde AP-Fonden, a Swedish-government run pension fund with investments in Activision-Blizzard, filed a lawsuit in November 2022 within the U.S. court system against Microsoft and Activision-Blizzard of collusion in establishing the deal. The lawsuit asserts that because of Activision-Blizzard's weakened position resulting from the workplace harassment lawsuit from the California DFEH, that Microsoft negotiated with Kotick and Activision-Blizzard to buy the company at a reduced price. The lawsuit also named Kotick for using the deal to cover up his alleged misconduct related to the DFEH suit.

A group of gamers filed suit against Microsoft in December 2022 to block the merger under the Clayton Antitrust Act of 1914 which enables consumers to file such lawsuits. The suit argues that should the merger go through, Microsoft's combined power would disrupt the video game marketplace, giving Microsoft the capability to outpace competitors and take a stronger hold. Microsoft failed to have the case dismissed in January 2023, and arguments related to a preliminary discussion will be presented to the judge in March 2023.

Reactions and commentary
Several Activision Blizzard employees have expressed cautious optimism with respect to the deal, with the ABK Workers Alliance, a group of employees pushing for unionization in the wake of the DFEH lawsuit, saying the acquisition did "not change the goals" of the Alliance. A report by Business Insider suggested several Microsoft employees have raised their concern on the deal with respect to the sexual harassment scandals and Activision Blizzard workplace culture, hoping for "concrete steps to make sure we aren't introducing a dangerous and unwelcome culture." On January 19, 2022, World Bank president David Malpass criticized the acquisition, contrasting the acquisition price with the smaller amount of bond financing available to developing countries during the COVID-19 pandemic.

Concerns on Microsoft's potential ownership of the Call of Duty franchise, which has sold over 400 million units by April 2021 and considered one of the most valuable properties within the video game industry, have been raised by Sony Interactive Entertainment and regulators. Shortly after the acquisition announcements, Sony had stated that they expect Microsoft to honor all of Activision Blizzard's publishing agreements for multiplatform games, assuring that Call of Duty would remain available on the PlayStation platform and not made a console-exclusive title. Spencer and Microsoft president Brad Smith reassured that Microsoft will continue these existing agreements and expressed their desire to keep Call of Duty and other popular Activision Blizzard games on PlayStation beyond the terms of these agreements, as well as explore the opportunity to bring these games to the Nintendo consoles.

Around September 2022, Xbox head Phil Spencer said Microsoft had written a letter to Sony in January, affirming their commitment to maintain Call of Duty on the PlayStation "several years" beyond the current contractual agreements set before the acquisition, which are said to last until 2024 according to Bloomberg. Spencer said their offer to Sony "goes well beyond typical gaming industry agreements". Sony's president Jim Ryan responded to Spencer by stating that in their commitment, Microsoft only stated their intent to keep Call of Duty for three more years beyond the current contract terms, and that "their proposal was inadequate on many levels and failed to take account of the impact on our gamers. We want to guarantee PlayStation gamers continue to have the highest quality Call of Duty experience, and Microsoft's proposal undermines this principle." Public documents filed as part of the UK's investigation revealed that Microsoft would be limited by prior contractual agreements between Sony and Activision to provide Call of Duty on Xbox Game Pass for several years.

Microsoft stated that it had written to Sony on November 11, 2022, to agree to a ten-year commitment for Call of Duty to remain non-exclusive to Xbox. Sony further stated that Microsoft's intent with the acquisition is to remove Sony and PlayStation from competition with Microsoft and instead have the PlayStation platform more comparable to the Nintendo Switch, which Sony stated is based on taking up a family-friendly position and not attempting to compete with adult-rated games like Call of Duty. Besides the commitment to Sony, Microsoft also had committed in December 2022 to a similar ten-year deal to bring Call of Duty to Nintendo's platforms, further attempting to prove to regulators they had no intent to make the title exclusive to Xbox or Windows.

Spencer further had stated that Microsoft's intent with the acquisition is access to Activision's mobile games, which would include those by its King division such as Candy Crush Saga. He said that while there are 200 million game console users worldwide, the mobile market reaches over 3 billion people.

References

Microsoft acquisitions
Activision Blizzard
Xbox Game Studios
Announced mergers and acquisitions
History of Microsoft